Gentleman Jack may refer to:

People
 Legs Diamond (1897–1931), Irish American gangster during the Prohibition era
 Gentleman Jack Gallagher (born 1990), English wrestler
 Anne Lister (1791–1840), English diarist
 John Reid McGowan (1872–1912), Australian boxer
 Jack Purtell (1921–2017), Australian jockey
 Jack Sears (1930–2016), English race and rally driver

Other uses
 Gentleman Jack (TV series), a 2019–22 British-American drama series based on the life of Anne Lister
 "Gentleman Jack", a 2012 song by O'Hooley & Tidow used as the closing theme for the TV series
 John "Gentleman Jack" Darby, a character from the 1957–62 American TV series Maverick
 Gentleman Jack, a brand of 80 proof whiskey by Jack Daniel's

Lists of people by nickname